On 1 March 1975, a bomb exploded on a crowded bus in central Nairobi in Kenya. It killed at least 27 people and injured another 90 when it detonated, ripping the bus open. The bus was about to leave for Mombasa.

See also
Terrorism in Kenya

References

1975 in Kenya
1975 bus bombing
20th-century mass murder in Africa
Bus bombings in Africa
Improvised explosive device bombings in 1975
Improvised explosive device bombings in Kenya
March 1975 crimes
March 1975 events in Africa
1975 bus bombing
Terrorist incidents in Nairobi
1975 murders in Kenya